"Something in the Water" is the lead single from Brooke Fraser's third studio album, Flags. It was released by Sony Music Entertainment in New Zealand on 2 August 2010 and subsequently became her first chart-topper, reaching number one in October. It was also her first international hit, reaching the top 10 in Austria, Germany, Luxembourg, and Switzerland.

Background and reception

Fraser told fans via Twitter that "['Something in the Water'] is a bit different to what you might be used to from me". Scott Kara from The New Zealand Herald called the song "a right little thigh-slapper, with a bit of a stomp to it, and it's about good times, drinking wine, and being in love."
The Sunday Star-Times Grant Smithies referred to it as "an unexpectedly perky country-pop ditty built around a rollicking bluegrass stomp." Both writers compared the song to the busts of Dolly Parton.

Chart performance
"Something in the Water" debuted on the New Zealand Singles Chart of 9 August 2010 at number 10. On 18 October 2010 it peaked at number one, replacing Bruno Mars' "Just the Way You Are"; this was Fraser's first number-one single in her home country and eighth top 20 single overall, spending a total of 29 weeks on the chart. At the end of the year, the single made it to number 16 on the year-end chart. It also proved to be her breakout hit in Australia and Europe. The song debuted and peaked at number 29 on Australia's ARIA Singles Chart on 7 November 2010, spending six weeks in the top 50. In 2011, the song was released in Europe and became a major hit in German-speaking countries, reaching number eight in Germany and Luxembourg and number 10 in Austria and Switzerland. The song also charted in Belgium, France (in 2012), and the Netherlands. Although Fraser's prior single "Shadowfeet" did enter the US Christian Songs chart, "Something in the Water" did not continue Fraser's success in that country.

Music video
According to Fraser via Facebook, the video for "Something in the Water" was shot in August. Directed by Joe Kefali and Campbell Hooper, it was released onto YouTube on 31 August 2010.

Track listingCD single "Something in the Water" - 3:04
 "Orphans, Kingdoms" - 3:55Digital EP'
 "Something in the Water" - 3:04
 "Orphans, Kingdoms" - 3:54
 "Coachella" (Extended Version) - 4:32

Charts

Weekly charts

Year-end charts

Certifications

Release history

See also
List of number-one singles in 2010 (New Zealand)

References

2010 singles
APRA Award winners
Brooke Fraser songs
Number-one singles in New Zealand
2010 songs
Sony Music singles
Songs written by Brooke Fraser